

Great Britain
 Bahamas – William Shirley, Governor of the Bahamas (1760–1775)
 Bermuda – George James Bruere, Governor (1764–1780)
 Bombay – Thomas Hodges, Governor (1767–1771)
Province of New Jersey – William Franklin, Governor (1763–1776)

Portugal
 Angola – Francisco Inocéncio de Sousa Coutinho, Governor (1764–1772)
 Macau – Diogo Fernandes Salema e Saldanha, Governor of Macau (1767–1770)

Colonial governors
Colonial governors
1768